Igor Lewczuk (born 30 May 1985) is a Polish professional footballer who plays as a defender for Weszło Warsaw. Besides Poland, he has played in France.

Career

Club
In January 2011, he was loaned to Piast Gliwice.

In June 2011, he was loaned to Ruch Chorzów on a one-year deal.

On 19 June 2014, Lewczuk signed three-year deal with Legia Warsaw.

On 31 August 2016, French club Bordeaux announced that Lewczuk would play for them for the next two seasons.

On 12 June 2019, Lewczuk returned to Legia Warsaw on a 1-year contract with an option for a further year.

Career statistics

Club

International

Honours

Club
Jagiellonia Białystok
 Polish Cup: 2009–10

Zawisza Bydgoszcz
 Polish Cup: 2013–14

Legia Warsaw
 Ekstraklasa: 2015–16, 2016–17, 2019–20, 2020–21
 Polish Cup: 2014–15, 2015–16

References

1985 births
Living people
Association football defenders
Polish footballers
Poland international footballers
Znicz Pruszków players
Hetman Białystok players
Jagiellonia Białystok players
Piast Gliwice players
Ruch Chorzów players
Zawisza Bydgoszcz players
Legia Warsaw players
FC Girondins de Bordeaux players
KTS Weszło Warsaw players
Ligue 1 players
Ekstraklasa players
I liga players
II liga players
Sportspeople from Białystok
Polish expatriate footballers
Polish expatriate sportspeople in France
Expatriate footballers in France